Rosenbergia exigua is a longhorn beetle species found in New Guinea. It can grow to be up to 32 mm long. It was first described by Charles Joseph Gahan in 1888.

References

Batocerini
Beetles described in 1888
Taxa named by Charles Joseph Gahan